Nathnagar railway station is a railway station on Sahibganj loop line under the Malda railway division of Eastern Railway zone. It is situated at Champapur, Noorpur, Nathnagar in Bhagalpur district in the Indian state of Bihar.

References

Railway stations in Bhagalpur district
Malda railway division